James Ruddell-Todd (4 December 1852) was a British politician. He was elected to serve as Member of Parliament (MP) for Honiton on 23 December 1832.

Ruddell-Todd was born in Seagoe parish, County Armagh, Ireland, to 
John Ruddell and Grace Bell Todd. He was a director of the South Australian Company.

References

1780s births
1852 deaths
Date of birth missing
UK MPs 1832–1835
Members of the Parliament of the United Kingdom for Honiton